NCDR may refer to:

 Kool Smiles in Georgia, United States
 National Science and Technology Center for Disaster Reduction in New Taipei, Taiwan